The 1956 Delaware gubernatorial election was held on November 6, 1956.

Incumbent Republican Governor J. Caleb Boggs defeated Democratic nominee James Hoge Tyler McConnell with 51.95% of the vote.

Nominations
Nominations were made by party conventions.

Democratic nomination
The Democratic convention was held on August 30 at Dover.

Candidate
J. H. Tyler McConnell, secretary of the Hercules Power Co., unanimous

Republican nomination
The Republican convention was held on August 29 at the Capitol Theater, Dover.

Candidate
J. Caleb Boggs, incumbent Governor, unopposed

General election

Results

References

Bibliography
 
 

1956
Delaware
Gubernatorial
November 1956 events in the United States